Miss USA 1958 was the 7th Miss USA pageant, held in Long Beach, California on July 23, 1958. The pageant was won by Eurlyne Howell of Louisiana, who was crowned by outgoing titleholder Charlotte Sheffield of Utah.  Howell went on to finish as 3rd runner-up to Luz Marina Zuluaga of Colombia at Miss Universe 1958.  The 1958 pageant was the last to include a city delegate (Kathleen Conyers of Philadelphia) in the line-up.

Results

Historical significance 
 Louisiana wins competition for the first time. Also becoming in the 8th state who does it for the first time. 
 Florida earns the 1st runner-up position for the first time.
 Alabama earns the 2nd runner-up position for the second time. The last time it placed this was in 1953.
 Illinois earns the 3rd runner-up position for the first time. 
 Georgia earns the 4th runner-up position for the second time. The last time it placed this was in 1955.
 States that placed in semifinals the previous year were California, Illinois, Nebraska, New York, South Carolina,  Texas, Utah and Washington.
 Nebraska, South Carolina and Texas placed for the sixth consecutive year. 
 Washington placed for the fourth consecutive year. 
 Utah placed for the third consecutive year. 
 California, Illinois and New York made their second consecutive placement.
 Tennessee last placed in 1956.
 Georgia and Florida last placed in 1955.
 Montana last placed in 1954.
 Alabama and Louisiana last placed in 1953.
 South Dakota placed for the first time.
 Iowa, Maryland and Ohio break an ongoing streak of placements since 1956.
 Arkansas breaks an ongoing streak of placements since 1954.

Delegates
The Miss USA 1958 delegates were:

 Alabama - Judith Carlson
 Arizona - Shirlee Fox
 Arkansas - Nancy Hill
 California - Donna Brooks
 Colorado - Devona Hubka
 Connecticut - Dorothy Dillen
 Delaware - Virginia Jefferson
 District of Columbia - Betty Sue Robertson
 Florida - Marcia Valibus
 Georgia - Diane Austin
 Idaho - Jeanette Ashton
 Illinois - June Pickney
 Indiana - Shirley Ball
 Iowa - Sandra Olsen
 Kentucky - Shannon Beasley
 Louisiana - Eurlyne Howell
 Maine - Karen Hansen
 Maryland - Patricia Vogts
 Massachusetts - Sally Freedman
 Michigan - Shirley Black
 Minnesota - Sue Bouchard
 Missouri - Beverly Wright
 Montana - Sharon Tietjen
 Nebraska - Dee Kjeldgaard
 Nevada - Terry Jeffers
 New Hampshire - Patricia Larrabee
 New Jersey - Fay Hasenauer
 New Mexico - Sandi Bullis
 New York - Virginia Fox
 North Carolina - Carol Edwards
 North Dakota - Diana Spidahl
 Ohio - Cindy Garrison
 Pennsylvania - Natalie Dee
 Philadelphia - Kathleen Conyers
 Rhode Island - Claire di Paolo
 South Carolina - Patricia Moss
 South Dakota - Helen Youngquist
 Tennessee - Martha Boales
 Texas - Linda Daugherty
 Utah - Sandra Pugh
 Vermont - Doreen McNamee
 Virginia - Betty Marsh
 Washington - Rose Nielsen
 West Virginia - Mary Ann Guthrie
 Wyoming - Dorothy Kochiras

External links 
 

1958
1958 in the United States
1958 beauty pageants
1958 in California